Libraries in Taipei include:

National Central Library, the national library of Taiwan
National Taiwan University of Science and Technology library
Taipei Medical University library
Taipei Public Library Beitou Branch
Taipei Main Public Library

See also

List of schools in Taipei
List of universities and colleges in Taipei

 
Lists of places in Taiwan